Peter Rengel (born 1 December 1987) is a Slovak professional footballer.

Club career

Győri ETO FC
On 2 August 2019 Győri ETO FC announced, that Rengel had joined the club from Gyirmót FC Győr.

References

External links
Peter Rengel at Futbalnet

1987 births
Living people
Association football goalkeepers
Slovak footballers
Slovak expatriate footballers
TJ OFC Gabčíkovo players
FC Spartak Trnava players
ŠK Senec players
Gyirmót FC Győr players
Győri ETO FC players
2. Liga (Slovakia) players
Nemzeti Bajnokság II players
Slovak expatriate sportspeople in Hungary
Expatriate footballers in Hungary
Association football forwards
Sportspeople from Dunajská Streda